The men's 100 metres at the 2002 European Athletics Championships were held at the Olympic Stadium on August 6 and August 7.

Medalists

Note: Dwain Chambers had originally won the gold but he was later disqualified for steroid use.

Results

Round 1
Qualification: First 4 in each heat (Q) and the next 8 fastest (q) advance to the Round 2.

Round 2
Qualification: First 4 in each heat (Q)  advance to the semifinals.

Semifinals
Qualification: First 4 in each semifinal (Q)  advance to the final.

Final

External links
Results

100 metres at the European Athletics Championships
Decathlon